Fulgoraria is a genus of sea snails, marine gastropod mollusks in the family Volutidae.

Species
Species within the genus Fulgoraria include:
 Subgenus Fulgoraria (Fulgoraria) Schumacher, 1817
 Fulgoraria alforum Thach, 2014
 Fulgoraria allanlimpusi Thach & Bail, 2018
 Fulgoraria baili Thach, 2018
 Fulgoraria bailorum Thach, 2014
 Fulgoraria callomoni Thach, 2015
 Fulgoraria ericarum Douté, 1997
 Fulgoraria hamillei (Crosse, 1869)
 Fulgoraria hitoshiikedai Thach & Bail, 2018
 Fulgoraria humerosa Rehder, 1969
 Fulgoraria kaoae Bail, 2008
 Fulgoraria leviuscula Rehder, 1969
 Fulgoraria limpusi Thach, 2020
 Fulgoraria ngai Thach, 2020
 Fulgoraria ngocngai Bail & Thach, 2017
 Fulgoraria patricebaili Thach, 2017
 Fulgoraria phanhayi Thach, 2020
 Fulgoraria philippsi Thach, 2016
 Fulgoraria rupestris (Gmelin, 1791)
 Subgenus Fulgoraria (Kurodina) Rehder, 1969
 Fulgoraria smithi (Sowerby III, 1901)
 Subgenus Fulgoraria (Musashia) Hayashi, 1966
 Fulgoraria allaryi Bail, 2005
 Fulgoraria cancellata Kuroda & Habe, 1950
 Fulgoraria carnicolor Bail & Chino, 2010
 Fulgoraria chinoi Bail, 2000
 Fulgoraria clara (Sowerby III, 1914)
 Fulgoraria formosana Azuma, 1967
 Fulgoraria hirasei (Sowerby III, 1912)
 Fulgoraria hitoshiikedai Thach & Bail, 2018
 Fulgoraria noguchii Hayashi, 1960
 Subgenus Fulgoraria (Nipponomelon) Shikama, 1967
 Fulgoraria elongata Shikama, 1962
 Fulgoraria megaspira (Sowerby I, 1844)
 Subgenus Fulgoraria (Psephaea) Crosse, 1871
 Fulgoraria concinna (Broderip, 1836)
 Fulgoraria daviesi (Fulton, 1938)
 Fulgoraria kamakurensis Okuta, 1949
 Fulgoraria kaneko Hirase, 1922
 Fulgoraria kaoae Bail, 2008
 Fulgoraria mentiens (Fulton, 1940)

 Species brought into synonymy 
 Fulgoraria delicata (Fulton, 1940): synonym of Saotomea (Saotomea) delicata (Fulton, 1940)
 Fulgoraria minima Bondarev, 1994: synonym of Saotomea (Bondarevia) minima (Bondarev, 1994)
 Fulgoraria pratasensis Lan, 1997: synonym of Saotomea (Saotomea) pratasensis Lan, 1997
 Fulgoraria solida Bail & Chino, 2000: synonym of Saotomea (Saotomea) solida (Bail & Chino, 2000)

References
 Bail, P., Chino, M. & Terryn, Y. (2010). The Family Volutidae. The endemic Far East Asian subfamily Fulgorariinae Pilsbry & Olsson, 1954. A revision of the recent species. In: Poppe, G. T. & Groh, K.: A Conchological Iconography. 74 pp., 64 plts. ConchBooks, Hackenheim, .

 
Gastropod genera